The Boston Red Sox are a Major League Baseball (MLB) franchise based in Boston, Massachusetts. The first game of each baseball season for a team is played on Opening Day, for which being named the starting pitcher is an honor. That honor is often given to the player who is expected to lead the pitching staff that season, although there are various strategic reasons why a team's best pitcher might not start on Opening Day.

Records
Including the result of the team's first  game, the team has had 122 Opening Days. In those Opening Day games:
 The team has used 64 different starting pitchers.
 Roger Clemens holds the team record for most starts with eight. Other pitchers with four or more starts are Pedro Martínez (7), Cy Young (6), Dennis Eckersley (5), Jon Lester (4), Bill Monbouquette (4), and Mel Parnell (4).
The first MLB night game did not occur until .
 Starting pitchers have compiled a win–loss record of 48–44, with 30 no decisions.
 The most wins is three, by Roger Clemens, Wes Ferrell, Pedro Martínez, Babe Ruth, and Cy Young. The most losses is three, by Howard Ehmke and Cy Young. The most no decisions is three, by Clemens and Martínez.

Results by decade

 1900s spans nine seasons, as 1901 was the team's first season.
 Number (and names) of pitchers making their first Opening Day start for the Red Sox franchise.

Pitchers

Key

List

References 

Opening day starters
Lists of Major League Baseball Opening Day starting pitchers